Mezzo-soprano Marga Schiml participated in several recordings in concert and opera.

Discographies of German artists
Classical music discographies